Oscar Shumsky (March 23, 1917 in Philadelphia – July 24, 2000 in Rye, New York) was an American violinist and conductor born to Russian-Jewish parents.  Oscar Shumsky married Louise Sophia Carboni  on October 4, 1939.  Together they had two sons; Noel (a business executive & teacher) and Eric (a violist & teacher). 
A great deal has been written about Shumsky’s musical artistry; however, little is known about his “other interests”.  Since his childhood in Philadelphia Shumsky was fascinated with photography.  He was an avid amateur photographer who could often be found with a camera.   His photographic skills and knowledge were recognized by the great American photographer- Ansel Adams.  The two men became friends drawn together by their mutual interests and respect; Shumsky a professional musician and amateur photographer and Adams a professional photographer and amateur musician (pianist).  
Shumsky had a curiosity with the world around him. He was drawn to biology and microbiology which led him to the field of photo microscopy. He would often find himself in a situation where he needed a special mounting to marry one optical device to another. He taught himself how to use a metal lathe and other machining tools to build whatever was needed to accomplish the task.

Biography
Oscar Shumsky started learning the violin at the age of three, and made his concert debut at the age of seven with the Philadelphia Orchestra under Leopold Stokowski, who declared him to be "the most astounding genius I have ever heard". Fritz Kreisler took a special interest in him, and he played Kreisler's own cadenzas to the Beethoven violin concerto to him after learning them by ear. He was a pupil of Leopold Auer from 1925 and studied at the Curtis Institute of Music from 1928 to 1936, continuing his studies with Efrem Zimbalist after Auer's death in 1930. His New York debut was in 1934 and his Vienna debut was in 1936. He played first violin in the Primrose Quartet from 1939, and the same year joined the NBC Symphony Orchestra under Arturo Toscanini. During the Second World War, he served in the U.S. Navy.

His violin was a Stradivari of 1715 known as 'Ex-Pierre Rode' or the 'Duke of Cambridge' (previously owned by Pierre Rode). It was used by Shumsky to record the complete 24 Caprices by Rode. He tells how he came to acquire the instrument:

He taught at the Curtis Institute, Philadelphia, Peabody Conservatory, Baltimore, Yale University, and, from 1953, the Juilliard School in New York. From 1959 to 1967, he co-directed the Stratford Festival (in Ontario) with Glenn Gould, with whom he played regularly at the festival and made some recordings for T.V. broadcast. Around this time, he appeared regularly as a soloist with American orchestras. His conducting debut was in 1959 with the Canadian National Festival Orchestra; he later conducted the Orchestral Workshop of Westchester, the Westchester Symphony Orchestra, and the Empire Sinfonietta in New York, and the New Jersey Colonial Symphony Orchestra.  He joined the Bach Aria Group in the early 1960s. He was granted a Ford Foundation Award in 1965.

He returned to concerts and recordings in 1981, performing in the USA and in Britain for the first time in 30 years; a programme he gave for solo violin led to great acclaim:

He recorded Eugène Ysaÿe's solo violin sonatas op.27 and Bach's sonatas and partitas for solo violin, the Beethoven violin concerto, Bach's single and double violin concertos, Mozart's 4th and 5th violin concertos, and other works, including the two Brahms Viola Sonatas on the viola. Many of these recordings have not been released on CD.

Many fellow violinists consider him to be one of the great violinists of the century; David Oistrakh called him "one of the world's greatest violinists" and the New Grove dictionary says of him: 'He was a player of virtuoso technique, pure style and refined taste; yet never sought recognition as a soloist, preferring to concentrate on teaching, chamber music playing and conducting.'

References

Boris Schwarz/Margaret Campbell: 'Shumsky, Oscar', Grove Music Online ed. L. Macy (Accessed 2007-06-25), http://www.grovemusic.com/ 
Robin Stowell: notes to Shumsky's recording of Pierre Rode: 24 Caprices for Solo Violin, ebs 6007

Further reading
M. Campbell: The Great Violinists
B. Schwarz: Great Masters of the Violin
J. Creighton: Discopaedia of the Violin, 1889–1971 (Toronto, 1974)
D. Rooney: Unshaken Ideals, in The Strad XCVIII (1987)

External links
http://www.shumskymusic.com/ - biography, discography, photos
Obituary - The Guardian

1917 births
2000 deaths
American classical violinists
Male classical violinists
American male violinists
American classical violists
American music educators
Musicians from Philadelphia
American people of Russian-Jewish descent
United States Navy personnel of World War II
Yale University faculty
Jewish classical musicians
20th-century classical violinists
Classical musicians from Pennsylvania
20th-century American male musicians
20th-century American violinists
20th-century violists